William Charles Roy Harvey (6 January 1921 – 23 April 2006), was Lord Mayor of Brisbane, Queensland, Australia from 1982 until 1985. A member of the Labor Party, he spent a total of 27 years on the Council.

History

Harvey was elected for seven three year terms as an Alderman of the Brisbane City Council representing the Council Ward of Kedron 1952–1973. He was the Labor member for Stafford in the Queensland Legislative Assembly from 1972–1974. He represented the Brisbane City Council Ward of Mitchelton 1979-1982 and held the office of Vice-Mayor of the City of Brisbane 1979–1982. Harvey also served on Finance Committee 1953-1955 and as Chairman 1979–1982. He was a member of the Health Committee 1955-1957 and the Works Committee 1957–1961. He was also served on the Establishment and Co-Ordination Committee 1961–1973,1979–1982 and as Chairman 1982-1985 and in addition as Chairman of the Council Transit and Electricity Committee 1961–1973.

Lord Mayor

Harvey was elected the position of Lord Mayor of Brisbane in 1982 and served until 1985. His wife, Pearl, acted as Lady Mayoress. His term included Brisbane's hosting of the 1982 Commonwealth Games. His predecessor in office, Frank Sleeman had secured the games for Brisbane. Harvey was defeated when he stood for re-election in 1985 against Liberal candidate, Sallyanne Atkinson. Dying in 2006, Harvey was accorded a state funeral and buried in Pinnaroo Lawn Cemetery.

References

 http://www.brisbane.qld.gov.au/BCC:STANDARD:1921318863:pc=PC_1889#harvey - Brisbane City Council site on Lord Mayor Harvey
 

2006 deaths
Mayors and Lord Mayors of Brisbane
1921 births
Burials at Pinnaroo Cemetery, Brisbane
20th-century Australian politicians